The Cormor is an Italian river in the Province of Udine. The source of the river is west of Fagagna and east of Spilimbergo. The river initially flows south but then curves east and flows past Martignacco. The river then flows south past Udine until it empties into the Laguna di Marano in the Adriatic Sea.

References

Rivers of Italy
Rivers of the Province of Udine
Adriatic Italian coast basins